Events in the year 1950 in Bulgaria.

Incumbents 

 General Secretaries of the Bulgarian Communist Party: Valko Chervenkov
 Chairmen of the Council of Ministers: Valko Chervenkov

Events

Sports 

 October 14 – 22 – The 1950 Men's European Volleyball Championship, the second edition of the event, was hosted in Sofia.

References 

 
1950s in Bulgaria
Years of the 20th century in Bulgaria
Bulgaria
Bulgaria